George Willis may refer to:

 George Willis (politician) (1903–1987), British Labour MP for Edinburgh constituencies
 George Philip Willis known as Phil Willis (born 1941), British Liberal Democrat MP for Harrogate and Knaresborough
 George Willis (Medal of Honor) (1839–?), US Navy sailor
 George Willis (physician) (1828–1898), British physician
 George Willis (footballer) (1926–2011), English footballer
 George Willis (British Army officer) (1823–1900), British Army general
 George Rodney Willis (1879–1960), American architect
 George Francis Willis (1880–1932), American millionaire; founded Avondale Estates, Georgia in 1924
 Clarence George Willis (1907–1984), politician in Saskatchewan, Canada
George Willis (1998-), actor featuring on various British TV shows from Casualty to Poldark.
George B. Willis, American legislator

See also
 George Wyllys (1590–1645), Governor of Connecticut